Polites baracoa, known generally as the baracoa skipper or little tawny edge skipper, is a species of grass skipper in the butterfly family Hesperiidae. It is found in the Caribbean Sea and North America.

The MONA or Hodges number for Polites baracoa is 4040.

Subspecies
These two subspecies belong to the species Polites baracoa:
 Polites baracoa baracoa (Lucas, 1857)
 Polites baracoa loma Evnas, 1955

References

Further reading

External links

 

Hesperiinae
Articles created by Qbugbot